Caulerpa sertularioides, also known as green feather algae, is a species of seaweed in the Caulerpaceae family found in warm water environments.

Description

It has feather-like fronds that arise from a common stolon. Each of the fronds is upright and branched. The oppositely arranged branchlets are cylindrical to needle-shaped with upcurved tips with a blunt point at the end. Stolons are branched out to slim points and rhizoids then form from bottom surface these fork and penetrate the sandy substrate firmly anchoring the seaweed to the seafloor.

Taxonomy

The species was first formally described by the botanist and taxonomist Marshall Avery Howe in 1905 as part of the work Phycological studies - II. New Chlorophyceae, new Rhodophyceae and miscellaneous notes as published in the Bulletin of the Torrey Botanical Club. The basionym is Fucus sertularioides as described by Samuel Gottlieb Gmelin in 1768.

Distribution
The species is found widely through tropical waters. In the United States it is found from North Carolina to Florida. It is also found throughout the Caribbean around Bermuda, Bahamas, Greater and Lesser Antilles and in the Gulf of Mexico and in the southern Atlantic Ocean to Brazil (Taylor 1979). It is also found in the Pacific Ocean along the Great Barrier Reef in Australia, Papua New Guinea, Philippines and Palau. In Western Australia, it is found along the coast in the Kimberley region extending south to the Gascoyne.

The species is usually part of coastal and estuarine environments where it grows in sandy areas, as seagrass beds or on and around mangrove roots.

References

sertularioides
Species described in 1905